IQT may refer to:

Coronel FAP Francisco Secada Vignetta International Airport, IATA code IQT, airport in Iquitos, Peru
Ignition Quality Tester, method of measuring the derived cetane number
In-Q-Tel, American not-for-profit venture capital firm